José Ferrándiz y Niño (1847–1918) was a Spanish soldier and politician who became a vicealmirante (vice admiral) in the Spanish Navy. He was born in Seville and died in Madrid.

He was teacher in the Floating Naval School (located in the old frigate Asturias) in Ferrol. He was part of Rear Admiral Manuel De La Camara's squadron (in command of a destroyer flotilla made up of Audaz (flagship), Osado, and Proserpina) when it was sent to Philippines during the Spanish–American War; the squadron was detained in Port Said, after a dispute with Egypt over permission to coal, and never reached its destination.

He reached the rank of Capitán de Navío (captain) in 1903, when he was appointed Minister of the Navy during Antonio Maura's first government. He was in office again from 1907 to 1909. During this time, he enacted the law 7 January 1908 (Official paper no 5, published 8 January 1908) for the building of a new squadron after the disastrous results of the Spanish–American War. Known as Ferrandiz's Law, this authorized:
 3 s of 15,700 tons each
 3 s of 350 tons each
 4 s of 800 tons each
 24 s of 180 tons each
 4 tankers
 1 tug
 Barges of munition and coal
 1 transport, 

He also ordered the modernization of the Cartagena and Ferrol shipyard and construction of a new dry dock for ships of up to 20,000 t (required by the planned Españas).

He was elected senador from Lérida in 1903 and from Málaga in 1907. In 1909, King Alfonso XIII named him senator for life.

References 

1847 births
1918 deaths
People from Seville
Spanish admirals
Members of the Senate of Spain
Government ministers of Spain
19th-century Spanish military personnel